Idaho is a state located in the Western United States. According to the 2020 United States Census, Idaho is the 13th least populous state with  inhabitants but the 11th largest by land area spanning  of land. Idaho is divided into 44 counties and contains 201 municipalities legally described as cities.

See also
Idaho
List of counties in Idaho

References

 
Idaho, List of cities in
Cities